Intruders is a 2011 supernatural horror film directed by Juan Carlos Fresnadillo and written by the Spanish duo Nicolás Casariego and Jaime Marques. The film stars Clive Owen, Carice van Houten, Daniel Brühl, Pilar López de Ayala, Ella Purnell, Izan Corchero, Kerry Fox and Héctor Alterio. The film follows a man and a woman trying to save their kids' life from an imaginary monster, known as Hollow Face, that is trying to take their face and soul.

Intruders was released in Spain on 7 October 2011 by Universal Pictures International and in the United Kingdom on 27 January 2012 by Universal Pictures. The film had grossed $5 million worldwide and received mixed-to-negative reviews from critics, who praised its performances, atmosphere and the first act, but criticized its bland plot, use of jump scares and the film's villain.

Plot

Though no one can see him, Hollow Face lurks in the corners, desperately desiring love but only knowing how to spread fear and hate.

In England, Hollow Face creeps into the life of John Farrow, after Farrow's 12-year-old daughter Mia is assaulted in their home. In Spain, Hollow Face creeps into the life of Luisa and her adolescent son Juan, after Juan is assaulted in their home. The line between the real and the imaginary blurs as fissures start to open within the family unit. It seems that no security measure can keep out Hollow Face.

Cast
 Clive Owen as John Farrow
 Carice van Houten as Susanna
 Ella Purnell as Mia Farrow
 Pilar López de Ayala as Luisa
 Izan Corchero as Juan
 Daniel Brühl as Father Antonio
 Mark Wingett as Grandfather
 Lolita Chakrabarti as Dr. Roy
 Kerry Fox as Dr. Rachel
 Raymond Waring and Adam Leese as Policemen

Production

The film stars Clive Owen, Kerry Fox, Carice van Houten and Daniel Brühl. The shooting began in late June 2010, in London, Madrid and Segovia, under the directorial guidance of Juan Carlos Fresnadillo. The screenplay was written by the Spanish duo Nicolás Casariego and Jaime Marques, based on a story by Juan Carlos Fresnadillo. Belén Atienza and Enrique López Lavigne works as producer for Antena 3 Films, Apaches Entertainment and Universal Pictures.

Release
Intruders was released in Spain on 7 October 2011 by Universal Pictures International and in the United Kingdom on 27 January 2012 by Universal Pictures. In the United States, the film received a limited release on 30 March 2012 by Millennium Entertainment.

Reception
Critical reception for Intruders the film has been mostly negative. Film review aggregator Rotten Tomatoes reported an approval rating of 32%, based on 72 reviews, with an average rating of 4.86/10. The website's critical consensus reads, "Intruders has a fantastic first act but then settles into a bland plot and scare tactics that aren't all too scary". On Metacritic, the film has a weighted average score of 45 out of 100, based on 21 critics, indicating "mixed or average reviews".

Lou Lumenick from the New York Post liked the film's opening and atmosphere but also criticised the film as being "underwhelming". Sean Burns from Philadelphia Weekly gave the film a negative review, criticising the film's climax, special effects, "disparate" storyline, and slow pacing. Burns also criticised the film's monster as being "not-particularly-frightening".

References

External links
 
 

2011 films
2011 horror films
2011 horror thriller films
2010s supernatural horror films
2010s supernatural thriller films
American horror thriller films
American supernatural horror films
American supernatural thriller films
British horror thriller films
British supernatural horror films
British supernatural thriller films
English-language Spanish films
Films about families
Films directed by Juan Carlos Fresnadillo
Films scored by Roque Baños
Films set in London
Films set in Madrid
Films shot in London
Films shot in Madrid
2010s Spanish-language films
Spanish supernatural horror films
Spanish thriller films
Atresmedia Cine films
2010s English-language films
2010s American films
2010s British films
2010s Spanish films